Club Capitán Figari is a Paraguayan football club based in the city of Lambaré. The club was founded March 1, 1931 and plays in the "Primera División B" division of the Paraguayan league (which is equivalent to the third division). Their home games are played at the Estadio Juan B. Ruíz Díaz which has a capacity of approximately 4,200 seats.

History 
It was founded on 1 March 1931 and its first president was Sinforiano Barrios. Soon, the club joined the Liga Lambareña de Fútbol, the Unión del Fútbol del Interior. In this league remained for more than four decades and won numerous championships.

In 1978 he was admitted to the tournament of the Segunda de Ascenso, the third division of the Paraguayan Football League, won the championship that same year undefeated. In 1979, also in the club's first participation in the Second Division, the club managed to win the title and reached the First Division. They only lasted a year in the top division.

In 2000, having participated for many years in the Second Division, third category which became the fourth in 1997 (with the creation of the Middle or new Second) won the championship that allowed the club to return to the Third Division.

They fell again in 2002, but the runner reached almost a decade later, in 2011, earned the team a place back in the third category of Paraguayan football.

The skipper of Figari and Empoli FC signed an agreement by which it is established that the Italian bank will charge the Organization and administration all lower division club. The event was attended by José Luis Gauto Galeano, president of Figari, and Carlos Bruni, head of the Scuola Italiana di Football in representation of Empoli.

Players

Honours 
 Paraguayan Second Division: 1
1978
 Paraguayan Third Division: 1
1977
 Paraguayan Fourth Division: 1
2000
 Paraguayan Fourth Division Runner-up
2011

References

External links 
 albiogol.com Club Capitan Figari Info
 agroclasi.com Info
 apf.org.py Info
 capiatadigital.com Info
 national-football-teams.com Profile

Capitan Figari
Association football clubs established in 1931
1931 establishments in Paraguay